The D-Lieferwagen L-7 (D delivery truck L-7) was a three wheeler pickup truck of the German industrial plants AG, which was built from 1927 to 1930 in Berlin suburb Spandau, Germany. The delivery van corresponded to the then demand for inexpensive vehicles for small and express transports in the cities.

History 
The market success of the tricycle cars Phänomobil and Cyklonette also prompted the motorcycle manufacturer Deutschen Industriewerke AG to design a cheap alternative to the automobile or small van: In 1927 was the L-7 presented as flatbed and van variant was able for payload of a half metric ton. Also a mobile market booth version was offered. The engine technology was taken from D-Rad. At a price of 1790 Reichsmark, the pickup truck was affordable for many craft businesses and small businesses.

In late 1920s the company faced increasing competition as more and more manufacturers launched wheel loaders; so the companies Zündapp, Monos, Mandernach, Rollfix-Eilwagen and Goliath; 1928 appeared the successful ones first pace tricycles. Therefore, in 1930 the production of the L-7 was stopped.

Technical specifications 
The Delivery truck L-7 had two front wheels between the cargo box and a chain driven single rear wheel, rivet assembled on a U-profile steel frame. An automobile steering wheel instead of the usual for early vehicles of this kind motorcycle handlebar.
27 × 3.85 inch bicycle tires were used for 320 to 346 kg empty vehicle. It reached a top speed of 50 km/h or 31 mph, with a fuel consumption 6 L/100 km or 39 MPG as well the oil consumption of 0.5 L/100 km. The fuel tank was 12 liter or 3.1 gallon.

As options a windshield, a soft top for the driver and a passenger seat were offered. In addition, a ball horn by Hella was available for RM 7.

Further reading 
 (German) Immo Sievers: Zweirad - Vierrad - Allrad. Fahrzeugbau in Spandau. Taschenbuch Edition Diesel Queen, Berlin-Friedenau 1995. .

References

External links 
 www.d-rad.ch – Informationen rund um das D-Rad und den D–Lieferwagen Type L7

Three-wheeled motor vehicles